Yargı (English: "The Judgement") is an ongoing Turkish television series developed by Ay Yapım, written by Sema Ergenekon and directed by Ali Bilgin. It stars Pınar Deniz and Kaan Urgancıoğlu. The first episode aired on September 19, 2021.

Plot
The series starts when Ilgaz (Kaan Urgancıoğlu), a respected public prosecutor, and Ceylin (Pınar Deniz), a young lawyer, cross paths due to a murder case, and are forced to work together in order to uncover the real culprit behind the event that caused an irreversible change in both of their lives.

Cast

Main
 Kaan Urgancıoğlu as Prosecutor Ilgaz Kaya
 Pınar Deniz as Attorney Ceylin Erguvan Kaya

Supporting 
 Uğur Polat as Attorney Yekta Tilmen
 Uğur Aslan as Detective Eren Duman
 Şükran Ovalı as Prosecutor Derya İhdal
 Merve Ateş as Tuğçe Duman
 Mehmet Yılmaz Ak as Prosecutor Pars Seçkin
 Onur Durmaz as Engin Tilmen
 Başak Gümülcinelioğlu as Judge Neva Seçkin
 Nilgün Türksever as Laçin Tilmen
 Nergis Öztürk as Seda Gökmen
 Muttalip Müjdeci as Police Chief Rafet
 Merih Ermakastar as Çetin
 Emir Özden as Attorney Tolga Çırmak
 Samet Kaan Kuyucu as Crime Reporter Burak Yıldırım

Ilgaz's family 
 Hüseyin Avni Danyal as Police Chief Metin Kaya
 Arda Anarat as Çınar Kaya
 Cezmi Baskın as Merdan Kaya
 Özlem Çakar as Makbule Kaya
 Beren Nur Karadiş as Defne Kaya

Ceylin's family
 Ece Yüksel as İnci Erguvan
 Ali Seçkiner Alıcı as Zafer Erguvan
 Zeyno Eracar as Gül Erguvan
 Pınar Çağlar Gençtürk as Aylin Erguvan Yılmaz
 Onur Özaydın as Osman Yılmaz
 Zeynep Atılgan as Parla Yılmaz

Others
 Yiğit Kalkavan as Rıdvan
 Dilara Çekir as Özge
 Onur Tekin as Officer Umut
 Hakan Dinçkol as Cüneyt
 Eray Ertüren as Serdar Denzi
 Zeynep Parla as Merve Demetoğlu
 Pınar Töre as Özlem
 Ayşenil Şamlıoğlu as former Judge Şahver Yengi
 Elif Melda Yılmaz as Hairdresser Ayten
 Kenan Bal as Haluk

Overview

Episodes

Season 1 (2021–2022)

Season 2 (2022–2023)

Viewership

Season 1 (2021–2022)

Season 2 (2022–2023)

Adaptations 
  – Παγιδευμένοι (English: "Trapped"), airing on ANT1

Accolades

Notes

References

External links 
  

Turkish crime drama television series
Television series by Ay Yapım
Kanal D original programming
2021 Turkish television series debuts